Indian Trails Council may be:

 Indian Trails Council (Wisconsin)
 Indian Trails Council (Connecticut)